Godaklu may refer to:
 Godaklu, East Azerbaijan
 Godaklu, West Azerbaijan